Maren Eggert (born 30 January 1974) is a German actress. She is best known for playing the role of Frieda Jung in the German TV series Tatort. Another notable appearance of her is the role of Dora in the 2001 film Das Experiment, opposite Moritz Bleibtreu. She starred in the film Marseille which was screened in the Un Certain Regard section at the 2004 Cannes Film Festival. Besides this she performs at the Thalia theatre in Hamburg.

In 2021, she became the first recipient of newly created Silver Bear for Best Leading Performance award at the 71st Berlin International Film Festival, for her role in I'm Your Man.

References

External links

1974 births
Living people
20th-century German actresses
21st-century German actresses
Actresses from Hamburg
German film actresses
German television actresses
Silver Bear for Best Leading Performance winners